Thiago Ramos Fernandes (born 11 October 1983 in Rio de Janeiro) is a Brazilian former footballer.

He signed a three-year contract with Fluminense in March 2003.

In January 2006, he was signed by a company Clube de Futebol do Rio de Janeiro on a 4-year deal.

He left for C.D. Olivais e Moscavide in August 2006.

External links
 CBF record

Brazilian footballers
Brazilian expatriate footballers
Fluminense FC players
Footballers from Rio de Janeiro (city)
1983 births
Living people
Expatriate footballers in Romania
Brazilian expatriate sportspeople in Romania
Liga I players
FC UTA Arad players
C.D. Olivais e Moscavide players
Association football forwards
Esporte Clube São João da Barra players